is a railway station operated by the Keisei Electric Railway located in Midori-ku, Chiba Japan. It is 8.8 kilometers from the terminus of the Keisei Chihara Line at Chiba-Chūō Station.

History
Oyumino Station was opened on 1 April 1995.

Station numbering was introduced to all Keisei Line stations on 17 July 2010. Oyumino was assigned station number KS64.

Lines
Keisei Electric Railway
Keisei Chihara Line

Layout
Oyumino Station has two elevated opposed side platforms, with a station building underneath. However, only one of the platforms is in use.

Platforms

External links
  Keisei Station layout

References

Railway stations in Japan opened in 1995
Railway stations in Chiba Prefecture